A Woman in Pawn is a 1927 British silent crime film directed by Edwin Greenwood and starring Gladys Jennings, John Stuart and Lauderdale Maitland. It was based on a melodramatic play by Frank Stayton. It was made at the Lime Grove Studios in Shepherd's Bush.

Plot
A ruined stockbroker is blamed for killing the crooked financier who lured his wife.

Cast
 Gladys Jennings as Diana Rawdon 
 John Stuart as James Rawdon 
 Lauderdale Maitland as George Zarantis 
 Chili Bouchier as Elaine 
 Tarva Penna as Phipps 
 Karen Petersen as Mrs. Phipps 
 Desmond Roberts as David Courthill

References

Bibliography
 Low, Rachael. History of the British Film, 1918-1929. George Allen & Unwin, 1971.

External links

1927 films
1927 crime films
British crime films
Films directed by Edwin Greenwood
British silent feature films
Films shot at Lime Grove Studios
British black-and-white films
Films produced by Victor Saville
1920s English-language films
1920s British films